Sismano, a little medieval borgo, is a frazione of the Italian commune of Avigliano Umbro, in the province of Terni. Sismano lies 13 km from Todi and 5 km from Avigliano; according to the Italian state census of 2001, Sismano has 17 inhabitants in the densely built historic center and 308 in all.

The large fortified rocca with two semi-circular towers, first built in the 11th century as part of the border defenses of Todi, had 21 hearths in 1322, according to a survey at Todi It was a possession of Benedetto Caetani, who spent many months here between 1281 and 1294, when he was elected pope, as Boniface VIII.

In 1324, a bloody battle was fought in the vicinity, between forces of Todi and Perugia and their friends and allies from Narni, Spoleto and Florence. The castle's fortifications were strengthened in 1340, when it was contended for by two local noble families, the Atti and the Chiaravalle, in a vendetta giving rise to numerous tragic episodes, following the beheading of Catalano Atti in 1393. In 1461 Matteo di Ulisse Chiaravalle took it from  Giacomo and Andrea degli Atti. In 1500 the Borgia Pope Alexander VI resolved the long-standing dispute in favour of the Atti, signors of Todi. On 14 October 1575, Eleanora Atti was murdered here by her husband, Orso II Orsini.

The Castello di Sismano, rebuilt in 1607

References

Frazioni of the Province of Terni